Jeffrey C. Herf (born April 24, 1947) is an American historian of Modern European, in particular, modern German history. He is Distinguished University Professor of modern European at the University of Maryland, College Park.

Biography
He was born and raised in Milwaukee, Wisconsin. Herf's father escaped from Nazi Germany in 1937 and immigrated to the United States. His mother's parents left Ukraine to came to the United States before World War I. He grew up in a Reform Jewish family in Milwaukee, Wisconsin.

Herf graduated in history from the University of Wisconsin–Madison in 1969 and received his PhD in sociology from Brandeis University in 1981. Before joining the faculty at the University of Maryland, he taught at Harvard University, Ohio University, and Emory University.   

In his 1984 book, Reactionary Modernism: Technology, Culture and Politics in Weimar and the Third Reich, drawing on critical theory, in particular ideology critique, Herf coined the term "reactionary modernism" to describe the mixture of robust modernity and an affirmative stance toward progress combined with dreams of the past, a highly technological romanticism, which was a current in the thinking of ideologues of Weimar's "conservative revolution" and of currents in the Nazi Party and Nazi regime.

His subsequent books examine the political culture of West Germany before and during the battle over Euromissiles in the 1980s; memory and politics regarding the Holocaust in East and West Germany; Nazi Germany's domestic antisemitic propaganda; and Nazi propaganda aimed at North Africa and the Middle East; and the history of antagonism to Israel by the East German regime and West German leftist organizations from the Six Day War in 1967 to the Revolutions of 1989, the collapse of the European Communist states and the German reunification in 1990.

Herf has had a variety of fellowships including at Harvard University, the University of Chicago, the Institute for Advanced Study in Princeton, the German Historical Institute in Washington, the Yitzhak Rabin Center for Israel Studies in Tel Aviv, the Woodrow Wilson International Center for Scholars in Washington, DC and at the American Academy in Berlin in Fall 2007.

He is married to the historian and artist Sonya Michel.

Awards and honors
1996 Charles Frankel Prize (co-winner) of the Wiener Library and Institute of Contemporary History, Divided Memory 
1998 George Louis Beer Prize, Divided Memory
2006 National Jewish Book Award, The Jewish Enemy
2010  [Washington Institute for Near East Policy, Bronze Prize] for Nazi Propaganda for the Arab World
2011 Sybil Halpern Prize, German Studies Association for Nazi Propaganda for the Arab World
2014 Appointed Distinguished University Professor, University of Maryland, College Park
2022 Bernard Lewis Prize, Association for the Study of the Middle East and Africa for "Israel's Moment: International Support for and Opposition to Establishing the Jewish State, 1945-1949"

Published Works
 Reactionary Modernism: Technology, Culture and Politics in Weimar and the Third Reich     French edition, Le Modernisme Reactionaire:  Haine de la Raison et Culte de la Technologie aux Sources du Nazisme, trans. Frederic Joly, (Paris: Editions L’Echappee, 2018); Greek edition, University of Crete Press, 1994; Italian edition, Il modernismo reazionario: Tecnologia, cultura e politica nella Germania di Weimar e del Terzo Reich (Bolgna: Il Mulino, 1988); Spanish edition, El Modernismo Reaccionario: Tecnologia, cultura y politica en Weimar y el Tercer Reich, (Mexico City: Fondo de Cultura Economica, 1990); Japanese edition, Iwanami Shoton, Tokyo, 1991; Greek edition, 1996; Portuguese edition, O Modernismo Reacionario: Tecnoligia, Cultura e Politica na Republica de Weimar e No 3 Reich, (Sao Paolo: Editora ensaio, 1993).  
  
 War By Other Means: Soviet Power, West German Resistance and the Battle of the Euromissiles (The Free Press, 1991. Examined the intersection of political culture and power politics in the last major European confrontation of the Cold War.

 Divided Memory: The Nazi Past in the Two Germanys (Harvard University Press, 1997.    German edition: Zweierlei Erinnerugn: Die NS Vergangenheit im geteilten Deutschland, (Berlin: Propylaen Verlag, 1998). 

 The Jewish Enemy: Nazi Propaganda During World War II and the Holocaust (Harvard University Press, 2006.  The work examines the Nazi regime's radical anti-Semitic propaganda as a bundle of hatreds, an explanatory framework, and effort to legitimate mass murder. Winner of the National Jewish Book Award for 2006 in the category of works on the Holocaust. Published in Spanish as El Enemigo Judio by Editorial Sudamericana, Buenes Aires, Argentina, 2008; in French as L’ennemi juif: La propagande nazie, 1939-1945 (Paris: Calmann-Levy, Paris, 2011; Portuguese as Inimigo Judeu: Propaganda nazista durante a Segunda Guerra Mundial e o Holocausto, (Sao Paolo, Edipro, 2014); Chinese, (Yilin Press, 2019).

  Nazi Propaganda for the Arab World (Yale University Press, 2009).  French edition: (2012); Italian (2010); Japanese (2013). This work documents and interprets Nazi Germany's Arabic language print and radio broadcast propaganda aimed at North Africa and the Middle East during World War II and the Holocaust. It draws on translations in German in various German government archives as well as a remarkable collection of English language transcripts produced by American diplomats, mostly in Cairo during the war. It documents a fusion of radical anti-Semitism in Nazi ideology with radical anti-Semitism emerging from Islamists and radical Arab nationalists who collaborated with the Nazi regime especially from 1941 to 1945 in Berlin. The cultural fusion in wartime Berlin persisted in Islamist politics in the Middle East after 1945. Recipient of the bi-annual Sybil Halpern Milton Prize for work on Nazi Germany and the Holocaust in 2009 and 2010 by the German Studies Association, September 2011; and 2010 Washington Institute for Near East Policy Bronze Book Prize. Italian edition, Propaganda Nazista Per Il Mondo Arabo (Rome: Edizioni dell’Altana, 2010). French edition, Hitler, la propaganda et le monde arabe (Paris: Calmann-Levy, 2012); Japanese edition: (Tokyo: Iwanami Shotun, 2013).

 Undeclared Wars with Israel: East Germany and the West German Far Left, 1967–1989 (Cambridge University Press, 2016).   German edition:  Unerklaerte Kriege gegen Israel: Die DDR und die westdeutsche radikale Linke, 1967-1989 (Goettingen: Wallstein Verlag, 2019).

 Israel's Moment: International Support for and Opposition to Establishing the Jewish State(Cambridge University Press, 2022): 
Edited books

Anthony McElligott and Jeffrey Herf, eds., Antisemitism Before and Since the Holocaust: Altered Contexts and Recent Perspectives (London: Palgrave Macmillan, 2017).

Jeffrey Herf, ed., Antisemitism and Anti-Zionism in Historical Perspectives: Convergence and Divergence (New York: Routledge, 2007).>

Translations
 Alfred Schmidt: History and structure: an essay on Hegelian-Marxist and structuralist theories of history. Cambridge, Massachusetts: MIT Press, c1981. 

 Articles 

 
 "What is Old and What is New about the Terrorism of Islamic Fundamentalism," Partisan Review, No. 69, Winter 2002
Essays and reviews on contemporary history, ideas and politics in  American Interest, American Purpose, Commentary, Fathom Journal, Frankfurther Allgemeine Zeitung, History News Network, New German Critique, The New Republic, Partisan Review, Quillette, The Tablet Magazine, Telos,Times of Israel, Washington Post, Die Welt, and Die Zeit.

References

External links
 Herf bio  at University of Maryland's site
 "The Historian as Provocateur: George Mosse’s Accomplishment and Legacy", Yad Vashem Studies'', vol. 29 (2001), pp. 7–26.
 The "New World Order": From Unilateralism to Cosmopolitanism by Herf
 “What Does Coming to Terms with the Past Mean in the ‘Berlin Republic’ in 2007?"
 "An Age of Murder: Ideology and Terror in Germany," Telos 144 (Fall 2008): 8–37

1947 births
Living people
American male non-fiction writers
Jewish American historians
Historians of Nazism
Historians of Europe
Brandeis University alumni
Ohio University faculty
University of Maryland, College Park faculty
20th-century American historians
21st-century American historians
20th-century American male writers
21st-century American male writers